Grace Elizabeth Stevenson, known professionally as Grace Hyland, is an Australian internet personality and LGBTQ rights activist. She is the daughter of television actor Mat Stevenson.

Biography 
Hyland is the daughter of Australian actor Mat Stevenson, who starred in the TV serial Home and Away as Adam Cameron

When Hyland was twelve years old, she came out to her family as transgender; first to her stepmother and then to her father, mother, and sister. An advocate for hormone blockers for transgender youth, Hyland stated that she went to a gender clinic for a year before being allowed to start hormone replacement therapy. She publicly changed her name to Grace when she was fourteen years old.

In 2020, Hyland amassed a large social media following, with 575,000 followers on TikTok and 145,000 on Instagram, where she uploads videos about life as a transgender woman. She uses her online platform to address issues pertaining to transgender people, and answering questions about the experiences of transgender people.

In January 2021, Hyland and her father appeared on The Sunday Project to talk about their experiences and issues facing transgender people in Australia.

Hyland is an aspiring actress and stated that she would like to play a transgender character in a television series.

She is a practicing Hindu.

References 

Living people
21st-century LGBT people
Australian Hindus
Australian TikTokers
Converts to Hinduism
LGBT Hindus
LGBT TikTokers
Australian LGBT rights activists
Social media influencers
Transgender entertainers
LGBT media personalities
Transgender women
Transgender rights activists
Year of birth missing (living people)